Teresin-Karczma is a settlement in the administrative district of Gmina Trzcianka, within Czarnków-Trzcianka County, Greater Poland Voivodeship, in west-central Poland. 

References

Teresin-Karczma